Ja'Tyre Carter (born January 15, 1999) is an American football guard for the Chicago Bears of the National Football League (NFL). He played college football at Southern and was drafted by the Bears in the seventh round of the 2022 NFL Draft.

College career
Carter was unranked as a recruit by 247Sports.com coming out of high school. He committed to Southern before the 2017 season.

Professional career
Carter was drafted by the Chicago Bears with the 226th pick in the seventh round of the 2022 NFL Draft.
During the NFL Draft Ja'Tyre Cater recorded these statistics
40-yard dash time = 5.13 seconds,
Bench Press = N/A,
Vertical Jump = 30 inches,
Broad Jump = 108 inches,
3 cone drill = 7.84 seconds, 
20-yard shuffle = 4.9 seconds, 
60-yard shuffle = N/A

References

External links
 Chicago Bears bio
 Southern Jaguars bio
 

1999 births
Living people
People from White Castle, Louisiana
Players of American football from Louisiana
American football offensive linemen
Southern Jaguars football players
Chicago Bears players